Diabolus in Musica, Accardo interpreta Paganini is a 1996 classical music album by violinist Salvatore Accardo playing musical works of Niccolò Paganini.

Track listing
 La Risate del Diavolo (tema) [0'34]
 La Campanella Rondo dal Concerto per violino e orchestra n. 2 [9'02]
 Capriccio per violino solo n. 5 Agitato [2'21]
 Adagio flebile con sentimento [6'50]
 Rondo galante. Andantino gaio dal Concerto per violino e orchestra n. 4 [11'13]
 Introduzione e variazioni su God save the king op. 9 [6'48]
 Capriccio per violino solo n. 24 Tema. Quasi Presto - Variazioni - Finale [4'30]
 Polacca. Andantino vivace dal Concerto per violino e orchestra n. 3 [11'37]
 Capriccio per violino solo n. 1 Andante [1'51]
 Rondo. Allegro spirituoso dal Concerto per violino e orchestra n. 1, op. 6 [9'47]
 Capriccio per violino solo n. 13 Allegro [2'04]
 Sonata Moto Perpetuo Allegro vivace [3'11]

References

1996 classical albums